Kalisch is the German name for Kalisz.

People with the surname Kalisch:
 David Kalisch (1820–1872), German Jewish playwright and humorist
 David Kalisch (economist) (born 1960), Australian economist and statistician
 Isidor Kalisch (1816–1886), Polish-American rabbi and author 
 Ludwig Kalisch (1814–1882), Polish-German Jewish novelist 
 Marcus Kalisch (1828–1885), German-British Hebraist and Bible commentator 
 Paul Kalisch (1855–1946), German Jewish singer

See also 
Kalish (disambiguation)
Kalisz (disambiguation)